Erandoli is a village in Miraj Taluka in Sangli District of Maharashtra State, India. It belongs to Desh or Paschim Maharashtra region. It is in Pune Division.

Taluka name: Miraj
District: Sangli 
State: Maharashtra 
Region: Desh or Paschim Maharashtra 
Division: Pune 
Language: Marathi and Kannada 
Time zone: IST (UTC+5:30) 
Telephone Code / Std Code: 0233 
Pin Code: 416410 
Post office name: Erandoli Post Office

About Erandoli 

Erandoli is a village in Sangli district of Maharashtra state of India.

It has a temple of goddess Janhavi Devi. Every year this village hosts a huge fair, somewhere in February–March in the name of goddess Jnhavi Devi. 
The region is famous for high amount of grapes production and sugarcane production.
Erandoli Pin code is 416410 and postal head office is Miraj. 
Erandoli is surrounded by various talukas. As Miraj Taluka is towards west, Shirol Taluka towards South, Tasgaon Taluka towards North, Ichalkaranji Taluka towards west. 
Miraj, Sangli, Tasgaon, Ichalkaranji are the nearby cities to Erandoli.	
This place is in the border of the Sangli District and Kolhapur District. Kolhapur District Shirol is South towards this place.
It is situated towards north direction of the Erandoli. Every year in the month of shravan students (mostly), people visiting to this place.

Demographics 

Erandoli is a large village located in Miraj of Sangli district, Maharashtra with total 1405 families residing. The Erandoli village has population of 6791, of which 3500 are males while 3291 are females as per Population Census 2011. 
In Erandoli village population of children with age 0–6 is 640, which makes up 9.42% of total population of village. Average Sex Ratio of Erandoli village is 940, which is higher than Maharashtra state average of 929. Child Sex Ratio for the Erandoli as per census is 916, higher than Maharashtra average of 894. 
Erandoli village has higher literacy rate compared to Maharashtra. In 2011, literacy rate of Erandoli village was 84.23% compared to 82.34% of Maharashtra. In Erandoli Male literacy stands at 91.88%, while female literacy rate was 76.11%. 
As per the constitution of India and the Panchyati Raaj Act, Erandoli  is administrated by a sarpanch (head of village) who is an elected representative. 
Marathi is the local language here although Kannada is also spoken by many people. 
Jains and Hindus are the predominant people in Erandoli.

Transport

By rail 
Arag Railway Station, Miraj Junction are nearby railway stations to Erandoli. Sangli Railway Station (near to Sangli), Madhavnagar Railway Station (near Sangli district) are the railway stations reachable from near by towns.

By road 
Miraj and Sangli are the nearby by towns to Erandoli with road connectivity to Erandoli.

References 

Villages in Sangli district